Yevgeny Yorkin (August 23, 1932 – November 13, 1982) was an ice hockey player who played for the Soviet national team. He won a bronze medal at the 1960 Winter Olympics.

References 

1932 births
1982 deaths
Ice hockey players at the 1960 Winter Olympics
Olympic ice hockey players of the Soviet Union
Olympic bronze medalists for the Soviet Union
Soviet ice hockey players
Olympic medalists in ice hockey
Medalists at the 1960 Winter Olympics